James Anthony Redden Jr. (March 13, 1929 – March 31, 2020) was an American judge and politician from Oregon. He was a senior United States district judge of the United States District Court for the District of Oregon, from 1995 to 2020, and, before that, had served as a federal judge since 1980. Before his appointment to the bench, he was a trial attorney, and a career Democratic politician, serving as a legislator and in two of the state's constitutional offices, as Treasurer and Attorney General.

Early life and education
Redden was born in Springfield, Massachusetts, the third child of James A. Redden Sr., a dentist, and his wife, Alma. He spent his early childhood in their home on Bronson Terrace at the eastern edge of Forest Park, where for a time his father also maintained his dental office. During what he would later describe as a "mediocre" high school career, Redden enlisted in the United States Army in 1946, serving two years as a PFC in occupied Japan. He was assigned as a hospital medic and witnessed the aftermath of the bombing of Hiroshima firsthand. He married Joan Johnson in 1951 and took several low-end jobs, including working coding survey sheets for the Gillette Razor Company, and managed not only to earn a belated high school diploma, but went on to Boston College and Boston College Law School, graduating with a Bachelor of Laws in 1954, and was admitted to the Massachusetts bar the same year.

Career

Law 
After engaging in the private practice of law in Massachusetts for only a year, Redden moved to Portland, Oregon, in 1955 to take the Oregon State Bar exam and a position with a title insurance company. His work as a title examiner lasted only one year, followed by an equally brief tenure as a claims adjuster for Allstate Insurance Company. Neither position satisfied what he would later describe as a growing passion for the law, particularly as it plays out in the courtroom. Redden lived for the next seventeen years in Medford, Oregon, where he built a law practice. He became immersed in politics, quickly becoming regarded as one of the Democratic Party's "rising stars".

Politics 
It was as a favor to a friend seeking a challenger to the incumbent Republican for the 19th District in the Oregon House of Representatives that Redden entered his first political race in 1962. He won the race and served for six years in the House, becoming the party Minority Leader in 1967. As a legislator, Redden was a key figure in some of Oregon's most groundbreaking legislative initiatives, including brokering the deal which brought the passage of the state's 1967 public beach access law. In 1969 Redden moved to the executive branch, becoming chairman of the Public Employee Relations Board until 1972. From 1973 to 1976 he was the state treasurer, and from 1977 to 1980, he was the Oregon Attorney General.

Jurist 
Redden was nominated by President Jimmy Carter on December 3, 1979, to a new seat on the United States District Court for the District of Oregon created by 92 Stat. 1629. He was confirmed by the United States Senate and received his commission on February 20, 1980. He served as Chief Judge from 1990 to 1995, and then assumed senior status on March 13, 1995. He assumed inactive senior status on March 31, 2017.

Notable cases
In 1983, Redden dismissed weapons charges, from 1975, against American Indian Movement leader Dennis Banks.

After 2003, Redden emerged as a central figure in the tension between industry and environmental concerns about the hydroelectric dams on the Columbia River, rejecting two management plans advanced by the federal government of the United States, on the grounds that they failed to protect various species of salmon, as required by the Endangered Species Act, and suggested that if the Bush administration failed to adequately address the salmon issue, management of the dams could fall to the courts. In November 2011, he announced that he would remove himself from the case prior to a new plan that the government presented in 2014.

Personal life
Redden married Joan Johnson in 1951; she predeceased him in 2018. They had two sons, William and James; James is a journalist at the Portland Tribune. Redden died on March 31, 2020, eighteen days after his 91st birthday, shortly after being treated for congestive heart failure. He had been living in an adult foster care home.

Honors
The federal courthouse in Medford, Oregon, where Redden practiced law for 17 years, was renamed by an Act of Congress in his honor.

References

External links
 

1929 births
2020 deaths
20th-century American judges
21st-century American judges
Boston College Law School alumni
Judges of the United States District Court for the District of Oregon
Massachusetts lawyers
Democratic Party members of the Oregon House of Representatives
Military personnel from Massachusetts
Oregon Attorneys General
Politicians from Beaverton, Oregon
Politicians from Springfield, Massachusetts
State treasurers of Oregon
United States district court judges appointed by Jimmy Carter